Luna Halo is the self-titled release from Luna Halo on October 30, 2007 on American Recordings. 

American singer-songwriter Taylor Swift covered the second track, "Untouchable" in a country pop style for the Platinum Edition (2009) of her second album, Fearless (2008). She re-recorded the cover as part of her first re-recorded album, Fearless (Taylor's Version) (2021).

Track listing
 Kings & Queens
 Untouchable
 Medicate
 I'm Alright
 On My Way
 On Your Side
 The Fool
 Big Escape 
 Falling Down 
 English Boys 
 World On Fire

References

2007 albums
Albums produced by Rick Rubin
Albums produced by Neal Avron